The following is a list of awards and nominations received by American actor Elisabeth Moss.

She has won numerous awards for her performances on television, including two Golden Globe Awards, two Primetime Emmy Awards, two Critics' Choice Television Awards, and two Screen Actors Guild Awards for her work on Mad Men (2007-2015), Top of the Lake (2013), and The Handmaids Tale (2017–present). She also earned a Tony Award nomination for her performance in The Heidi Chronicles (2015).

Major associations

Emmy Awards 
The Primetime Emmy Awards are presented by the Academy of Television Arts & Sciences, to recognize and honor achievements in the television industry.

Tony Awards 
The Antoinette Perry Award for Excellence in Broadway Theatre,  more commonly known as the Tony Award, recognizes excellence in live Broadway theatre. The awards are presented by the American Theatre Wing and The Broadway League at an annual ceremony in New York City.

Industry awards

AACTA Awards

BAFTA Awards 
The British Academy Television Awards are presented in an annual award show hosted by the British Academy of Film and Television Arts.

Golden Globe Awards 
The Golden Globe Awards are awards bestowed by the 93 members of the Hollywood Foreign Press Association (HFPA) recognizing excellence in film and television, both domestic and foreign.

Independent Spirit Awards
The Independent Spirit Awards are presented annually by Film Independent, to award the best in the independent film community.

Screen Actors Guild Awards 
The Screen Actors Guild Awards are organized by the Screen Actors Guild‐American Federation of Television and Radio Artists. First awarded in 1995, they aim to recognize excellent achievements in film and television.

Critics awards

Critics' Choice Awards
The Critics' Choice Television Awards are presented annually since 2011 by the Broadcast Television Journalists Association. The awards were launched "to enhance access for broadcast journalists covering the television industry".

HCA Awards

Theatre awards

Drama League Award 
The Drama League Awards, created in 1922, honor distinguished productions and performances both on Broadway and Off-Broadway, in addition to recognizing exemplary career achievements in theatre, musical theatre, and directing.

|-
!scope="row"|2015
| The Heidi Chronicles
|Distinguished Performance
|  
|}

Miscellaneous awards

ASTRA Awards 
The ASTRA Awards are the awards for the Australian subscription television industry. According to the Australian Subscription Television and Radio Association (ASTRA), the awards "recognize the wealth of talent that drives the Australian subscription television industry and highlight the creativity, commitment and investment in production and broadcasting."

|-
!scope="row"|2014
|Top of the Lake
| Most Outstanding Performance by an Actor – Female
| 
|}

Dorian Awards 
The Dorian Awards are presented by the Gay and Lesbian Entertainment Critics Association (GALECA). 

|-
!scope="row"|2011
| Mad Men
|TV Drama Performance of the Year
|  
|-
!scope="row"|2018
| The Handmaid's Tale
| TV Performance of the Year – Actress
| 
|}

Empire Awards 
The Empire Awards is a British awards ceremony held annually to recognize cinematic achievements. 

|-
!scope="row"|2018
|The Handmaid's Tale
|Best Actress in a TV Series
| 
|}

Monte-Carlo Television Festival 
The Monte-Carlo Television Festival is an international festival and competition focusing on productions for television, founded 1961 and based in Monaco.

|-
! scope="row" style="text-align:center;"| 2010
|rowspan=2| Mad Men
|rowspan=2| Outstanding Actress – Drama Series
| 
|-
! scope="row" style="text-align:center;"| 2011
| 
|-
! scope="row" style="text-align:center;"| 2014
| Top of the Lake
| Outstanding Actress in a Mini-Series
| 
|}

Satellite Awards 
Voted for by the International Press Academy, the Satellite Awards are held annually and honor achievements in television and film.

|-
! scope="row" style="text-align:center;"|2009
|rowspan=2|Mad Men
| Best Actress – Television Series Drama
| 
|-
! scope="row" style="text-align:center;"|2010
| Best Supporting Actress – Series, Miniseries or Television Film
| 
|-
! scope="row" style="text-align:center;"|2014
| Top of the Lake
|rowspan=2|Best Actress – Miniseries or Television Film
| 
|-
! scope="row" rowspan=2 style="text-align:center;"|2018
| Top of the Lake: China Girl
| 
|-
| The Handmaid's Tale
| Best Actress – Television Series Drama
| 
|-
! scope="row" style="text-align:center;"| 2019
| The Handmaid's Tale
| Best Actress in a Drama / Genre Series
| 
|}

Young Artist Awards 
Presented by Young Artist Association, a non-profit organization, the Young Artist Awards are held annually to honor young performers. 

|-
! scope="row" style="text-align:center;"| 2001
|The West Wing
| Best Performance in a TV Drama Series: Guest Starring Young Actress
| 
|}

Footnotes

References

External links
 List of awards and nominations at the Internet Movie Database

Lists of awards received by American actor